The 2013 Fuji GT 500km was the second round of the 2013 Super GT season. It took place on April 29, 2013.

Race result
Race result is as follows.

References

External links
Super GT official website 

Fuji GT 500km